is a near-Earth object and Apollo asteroid, approximately  in diameter. It was the most dangerous potentially hazardous asteroid on Sentry Risk Table upon its discovery by the Mount Lemmon Survey in December 2014. At the time, the asteroid had a cumulative 1 in 83000 chance of impacting Earth on 4–5 June between the years 2048 and 2084. After the object's observation arc had been extended to 35 days, it was removed from the Sentry Risk Table on 15 January 2015. Since then the asteroid's orbit has been secured. Although it has an Earth minimum orbit intersection distance of less than one lunar distance, there are no projected close encounters with Earth in the foreseeable future, with its closest passage to occur in May 2046, still millions of kilometers away.

Discovery 

It was discovered on 11 December 2014, by the Mount Lemmon Survey at an apparent magnitude of 20 using the Steward Observatory's  reflecting telescope at Mount Lemmon Observatory near Tucson, Arizona, and received the provisional designation .

Palermo Scale rating 

With an observation arc of only 19 days, it had a cumulative Palermo Scale rating of –2.85 and was briefly the 9th most dangerous asteroid known. It was calculated that on 4 June 2065, there was a 1 in 270,000 chance of impact and on 4 June 2076, there was a 1 in 137,000 chance of impact.

Orbit and classification 

, and last observed in November 2016, the asteroid has a better constrained orbit with an observation arc of 713 days and an uncertainty parameter of 2, which ranges from 0 (good) to 9 (highly uncertain). It has an apparent magnitude of 25.82, and orbits the Sun at a distance of 0.77–2.5 AU once every 2 years and 2 months (777 days; semi-major axis of 1.65 AU). Its orbit has an eccentricity of 0.53 and an inclination of 8° with respect to the ecliptic.

Notes

References

External links 
 List of the Potentially Hazardous Asteroids (PHAs), Minor Planet Center
 List Of Apollo Minor Planets (by designation), Minor Planet Center
 
 
 

Minor planet object articles (unnumbered)
Discoveries by MLS

20140901
20141211